Inner Space is a compilation album of Chick Corea music released by Atlantic Records in 1973. The album contains all four tracks from Corea's 1968 debut album, Tones for Joan's Bones as well as two previously unreleased tracks ("Inner Space" & "Guijira") from the same recording sessions and two tracks ("Windows" & "Trio for Flute, Bassoon and Piano") originally released on Hubert Laws' 1969 LP Laws' Cause.

Release history
The album was first released as a double LP by Atlantic Records in 1973. Early CD re-issues omit two tracks, "Tones for Joan's Bones" and "This Is New", but the 2008 release on the Collectables Records label restores them.

"Windows" was recorded August 10, 1966 and originally released on Hubert Laws' 1969 LP Laws' Cause.

Track listing
All tracks composed by Chick Corea except where noted.

Original double LP release
Side A
"Straight Up and Down" – 12:32
"This Is New" (Kurt Weill, Ira Gershwin) – 7:36
Side B
"Tones for Joan's Bones" – 6:03
"Litha" – 13:28
Side C
"Inner Space" – 9:18
"Windows" – 8:45
Side D
"Guijira" – 12:19
"Trio for Flute, Bassoon and Piano" – 5:07
 Tracks A1 to C1, D1 recorded at Atlantic Recording Studios, New York City, N.Y. on November 30 & December 1, 1966.
 Track C2 recorded at Atlantic Recording Studios, New York City, N.Y. on August 10, 1966.
 Track D2 recorded at A&R Studios, New York City, N.Y. NYC, March 27, 1968.
 Re-mixed at Atlantic Recording Studios, New York City, N.Y. in May, 1972.

Abridged CD re-issue
"Straight Up and Down" – 12:32	
"Litha" – 13:28	
"Inner Space" – 9:18	
"Windows" – 8:45	
"Guijira" – 12:19	
"Trio for Flute, Bassoon and Piano" – 5:07

The 2008 release on the Collectables label restores "This Is New" and "Tones for Joan's Bones".

Personnel
 Chick Corea – piano (on all tracks)
 Steve Swallow – bass (except "Windows" & "Trio for Flute, Bassoon and Piano")
 Joe Chambers – drums (except "Windows" & "Trio for Flute, Bassoon and Piano")
 Joe Farrell – tenor saxophone, flute (except "Windows" and "Trio for Flute, Bassoon and Piano")
 Woody Shaw – trumpet (except "Windows" & "Trio for Flute, Bassoon and Piano")

on "Windows"
 Hubert Laws – flute 
 Ron Carter – bass
 Grady Tate – drums

on "Trio for Flute, Bassoon and Piano"
 Karl Porter – bassoon
 Hubert Laws – flute

References

 Atlantic Records SD 2-305 / K 60081
 Atlantic Jazz (Germany) 7567-81304-2 (1988 CD)
 Chick Corea - Inner Space (rec. 1966 & 1968, rel. 1973) at Discogs (US double LP, Atlantic Records SD 2-305)
 Chick Corea - Inner Space (rec. 1966 & 1968, rel. 1988) at Discogs (1988 Abridged CD re-issue, Atlantic Jazz, 2-305-2)

External links 
 Chick Corea - Inner Space (rec. 1966 & 1968, rel. 1973) album review by Scott Yanow, credits & releases at AllMusic
 Chick Corea - Inner Space (rec. 1966 & 1968, rel. 1973) album releases & credits at Discogs
 Chick Corea - Inner Space (rec. 1966 & 1968, rel. 1973) album to be listened as stream on Spotify

Chick Corea albums
1973 albums
Atlantic Records albums